The 1998 Tampa Bay Devil Rays season was the first season in franchise history. This season, they finished last in the AL East division and finished the season with a record of 63–99, 51 games behind the World Champion New York Yankees. Their manager was Larry Rothschild.

Miguel Cairo was the last active player remaining from the Opening Day roster, until retiring after the 2012 season.

Offseason
March 11, 1997: Luis Polonia was signed as a free agent with the Tampa Bay Devil Rays.
May 10, 1997: Pete Laforest was signed as a free agent with the Tampa Bay Devil Rays.
June 3, 1997: Jason Standridge was drafted by the Tampa Bay Devil Rays in the 1st round (31st pick) of the 1997 amateur draft. Player signed June 6, 1997.
June 3, 1997: Kenny Kelly was drafted by the Tampa Bay Devil Rays in the 2nd round of the 1997 amateur draft. Player signed June 12, 1997.
November 11, 1997: Mike Kelly was traded by the Cincinnati Reds to the Tampa Bay Devil Rays for a player to be named later. The Tampa Bay Devil Rays sent Dmitri Young (November 18, 1997) to the Cincinnati Reds to complete the trade.
December 9, 1997: Wade Boggs signed as a free agent with the Tampa Bay Devil Rays.
December 16, 1997: Scott McClain was signed as a free agent with the Tampa Bay Devil Rays.
December 18, 1997: Josías Manzanillo was signed as a free agent with the Tampa Bay Devil Rays.
January 27, 1998: Dave Silvestri was signed as a free agent with the Tampa Bay Devil Rays.
January 27, 1998: Jerome Walton was signed as a free agent with the Tampa Bay Devil Rays.

Expansion Draft

Round 1

Round 2

Round 3

1996–97 MLB June drafts and minor league affiliates 

The two expansion teams set to debut in 1998, the Devil Rays and Arizona Diamondbacks, had two full seasons to establish scouting and player development systems and were permitted to participate fully in the 1996 and 1997 Major League Baseball drafts. The Devil Rays drafted 29th in 1996 (when they selected 97 players overall) and 31st in 1997 (when they selected 92). The team began developing those players in a farm system with three minor-league affiliates in 1996 and five in 1997.

Among the players selected and signed by Tampa Bay from those drafts were pitcher Dan Wheeler (34th round, 1996), catcher Toby Hall (ninth, 1997), infielder Jared Sandberg (16th, 1996) and outfielder Alex Sánchez (fifth, 1996).

1996 farm system 

Hudson Valley affiliation shared with Texas Rangers

1997 farm system 

LEAGUE CHAMPIONS: St. Petersburg

Regular season
March 31, 1998 – The Devil Rays played their inaugural game, as well as their first home game, against the Detroit Tigers.  The Tigers won 11–6 in front of an audience of 45,369 fans.
April 1, 1998 – The Devil Rays enjoyed the first win in their franchise's history, an 11-8 comeback against the Tigers.  Rolando Arrojo was the winning pitcher.
June 22, 1998 – The first interleague game between the Florida Marlins and the Tampa Bay Devil Rays took place at Tropicana Field. The rivalry would be known as the Citrus Series. The Marlins won the game in twelve innings by a score of 3–2.

Opening Day starters

Season standings

Record vs. opponents

Notable transactions
May 26, 1998: Jerome Walton was released by the Tampa Bay Devil Rays.
June 2, 1998: Aubrey Huff was drafted by the Tampa Bay Devil Rays in the 5th round of the 1998 amateur draft. Player signed June 17, 1998.
July 1, 1998: Josías Manzanillo was released by the Tampa Bay Devil Rays.

Citrus Series
The season series each year between the Devil Rays and the Florida Marlins has come to be known as the Citrus Series.  In 1998, the Marlins won the series 3 games to 1.

 June 22 - Devil Rays vs Marlins: 2 – 3
 June 23 - Devil Rays vs Marlins: 6 – 4
 June 24 - Devil Rays @ Marlins: 4 – 8
 June 25 - Devil Rays @ Marlins: 1 – 5

Roster

Player stats

Batting

Starters by position
Note: Pos = Position; G = Games played; AB = At bats; H = Hits; HR = Home runs; RBI = Runs batted in; Avg. = Batting average; SB = Stolen bases

Other batters
Note: G = Games played; AB = At bats; H = Hits; HR = Home runs; RBI = Runs batted in; Avg. = Batting average; SB = Stolen bases

Pitching

Starting pitchers
Note: G = Games pitched; IP = Innings pitched; W = Wins; L = Losses; ERA = Earned run average; SO = Strikeouts

Relief pitchers
Note: G = Games pitched; IP = Innings pitched; W = Wins; L = Losses; ERA = Earned run average; SO = Strikeouts; SV = Saves

Other pitchers
Note: G = Games pitched; IP = Innings pitched; W = Wins; L = Losses; ERA = Earned run average; SO = Strikeouts; SV = Saves

Game log

|-  style="text-align:center; background:#fbb;"
| 1 || March 31 || Tigers || 11 – 6 || Thompson (1-0) || Álvarez (0-1) || || 45,369 || 0-1
|-

|-  style="text-align:center; background:#bfb;"
| 2 || April 1 || Tigers || 11 – 8 || Arrojo (1-0) || Moehler (0-1) || || 30,109 || 1-1
|-  style="text-align:center; background:#bfb;"
| 3 || April 2 || Tigers || 7 – 1 || Yan (1-0) || Worrell (0-1) || || 28,261 || 2-1
|-  style="text-align:center; background:#fbb;"
| 4 || April 3 || White Sox || 10 – 4 || Baldwin (1-0) || Gorecki (0-1) || || 31,816 || 2-2
|-  style="text-align:center; background:#bfb;"
| 5 || April 4 || White Sox || 8 – 2 || Springer (1-0) || Eyre (0-1) ||  || 36,599 || 3-2
|-  style="text-align:center; background:#fbb;"
| 6 || April 5 || White Sox || 5 – 0 || Álvarez (1-1) || Bere (0-1) ||  || 33,733 || 4-2
|-  style="text-align:center; background:#fbb;"
| 7 || April 7 || @ Tigers || 3 – 1 || Florie (0-1) || Arrojo (1-1) || Jones (1) || 45,768 || 4-3
|-  style="text-align:center; background:#fbb;"
| 8 || April 10 || @ White Sox || 3 – 0 || Sirotka (1-1) || Saunders (0-1) || Karchner (1) || 13,563 || 4-4
|-  style="text-align:center; background:#bfb;"
| 9 || April 11 || @ White Sox || 5 – 1 || Gorecki (1-1) || Bere (0-2) || || 17,322 || 5-4
|-  style="text-align:center; background:#bfb;"
| 10 || April 12 || @ White Sox || 4 – 1 || Álvarez (2-1) || Navarro (0-2) || Hernández (1) || 14,004 || 6-4
|-  style="text-align:center; background:#bfb;"
| 11 || April 13 || Twins || 13 – 12 (14) || Yan (1-0) || Trombley (0-2) || || 31,969 || 7-4
|-  style="text-align:center; background:#fbb;"
| 12 || April 14 || Twins || 8 – 2 || Radke (2-1) || Springer (1-1) || || 34,337 || 7-5
|-  style="text-align:center; background:#bfb;"
| 13 || April 16 || @ Angels || 6 – 5 || Saunders (1-1) || Holtz (1-1) || Hernández (2) || 22,906 || 8-5
|-  style="text-align:center; background:#fbb;"
| 14 || April 17 || @ Angels || 5 – 0 || Finley (3-0) || Gorecki (1-2) || || 31,516 || 8-6
|-  style="text-align:center; background:#bfb;"
| 15 || April 18 || @ Angels || 8 – 1 || Álvarez (3-1) || Dickson (0-3) ||  || 37,878 || 9-6
|-  style="text-align:center; background:#bfb;"
| 16 || April 19 || @ Angels || 6 – 0 || Arrojo (2-1) || Watson (0-2) || || 34,580 || 10-6
|-  style="text-align:center; background:#fbb;"
| 17 || April 21 || @ Rangers || 4 – 0 || Sele (4-0) || Springer (1-2) || || 26,776 || 10-7
|-  style="text-align:center; background:#fbb;"
| 18 || April 22 || @ Rangers || 7 – 2 || Helling (4-0) || Saunders (1-2) || || 30,770 || 10-8
|-  style="text-align:center; background:#bfb;"
| 19 || April 23 || @ Rangers || 12 – 5 || Johnson (1-0) || Oliver (0-3) || || 33,319 || 11-8
|-  style="text-align:center; background:#fbb;"
| 20 || April 24 || Angels || 10 – 3 || Watson (1-2) || Álvarez (3-2) || || 27,767 || 11-9
|-  style="text-align:center; background:#fbb;"
| 21 || April 25 || Angels || 7 – 1 || Hill (4-1) || Arrojo (2-2) || || 33,395 || 11-10
|-  style="text-align:center; background:#fbb;"
| 22 || April 26 || Angels || 2 – 1 || Olivares (1-0) || Springer (1-3) || Percival (5) || 26,882 || 11-11
|-  style="text-align:center; background:#fbb;"
| 23 || April 27 || Athletics || 7 – 6 || Mathews (1-0) || Hernández (0-1) || Taylor (4) || 25,484 || 11-12
|-  style="text-align:center; background:#fbb;"
| 24 || April 28 || Athletics || 4 – 3 || Small (1-0) || Johnson (1-1) || Taylor (5) || 25,138 || 11-13
|-  style="text-align:center; background:#fbb;"
| 25 || April 29 || @ Twins || 2 – 0 || Tewksbury (1-0) || Álvarez (3-3) || Aguilera (5) || 8,964 || 11-14
|-  style="text-align:center; background:#bfb;"
| 26 || April 30 || @ Twins || 2 – 0 || Arrojo (3-2) || Hawkins (0-3) || || 8,860 || 12-14
|-

|-  style="text-align:center; background:#fbb;"
| 27 || May 1 || @ Indians || 7 – 5 || Colón (2-1) || Springer (1-4) || Jackson (10) || 42,712 || 12-15
|-  style="text-align:center; background:#fbb;"
| 28 || May 2 || @ Indians || 5 – 1 || Ogea (1-1) || Saunders (1-3) || || 42,525 || 12-16
|-  style="text-align:center; background:#fbb;"
| 29 || May 3 || @ Indians || 10 – 8 || Mesa (3-0) || Hernández (0-2) || || 42,597 || 12-17
|-  style="text-align:center; background:#fbb;"
| 30 || May 5 || @ Royals || 4 – 2 || Pichardo (3-0) || Álvarez (3-4) || Montgomery (6) || 12,096 || 12-18
|-  style="text-align:center; background:#bfb;"
| 31 || May 6 || @ Royals || 5 – 0 || Arrojo (4-2) || Rusch (3-4) || || 11,401 || 13-18
|-  style="text-align:center; background:#fbb;"
| 32 || May 8 || Orioles || 8 – 2 || Rhodes (3-0) || Lopez (0-1) || || 35,355 || 13-19
|-  style="text-align:center; background:#fbb;"
| 33 || May 9 || Orioles || 7 – 0 || Mussina (4-2) || Springer (1-5) || || 42,486 || 13-20
|-  style="text-align:center; background:#bfb;"
| 34 || May 10 || Orioles || 4 – 3 || Yan (3-0) || Mills (0-1) || Hernández (3) || 34,123 || 14-20
|-  style="text-align:center; background:#bfb;"
| 35 || May 11 || Indians || 4 – 2 || Arrojo (5-2) || Burba (3-4) || Hernández (4) || 30,334 || 15-20
|-  style="text-align:center; background:#bfb;"
| 36 || May 12 || Indians || 6 – 5 (15) || Santana (1-0) || Jackson (0-1) || || 30,194 || 16-20
|-  style="text-align:center; background:#fbb;"
| 37 || May 13 || Royals || 4 – 0 || Rapp (3-3) || Saunders (1-4) || || 25,244 || 16-21
|-  style="text-align:center; background:#fbb;"
| 38 || May 14 || Royals || 10 – 2 || Belcher (2-5) || Springer (1-6) || || 24,296 || 16-22
|-  style="text-align:center; background:#bfb;"
| 39 || May 15 || @ Orioles || 4 – 1 || Álvarez (4-4) || Erickson (4-2) || Hernández (5) || 47,421 || 17-22
|-  style="text-align:center; background:#bfb;"
| 40 || May 16 || @ Orioles || 5 – 2 || Arrojo (6-2) || Belcher (2-5) || Hernández (6) || 47,538 || 18-22
|-  style="text-align:center; background:#bfb;"
| 41 || May 17 || @ Orioles || 7 – 3 || Mecir (1-0) || Mills (0-2) || || 47,628 || 19-22
|-  style="text-align:center; background:#bfb;"
| 42 || May 18 || @ Orioles || 6 – 3 || Lopez (1-1) || Drabek (3-5) || Hernández (7) || 45,033 || 20-22
|-  style="text-align:center; background:#fbb;"
| 43 || May 19 || @ Blue Jays || 3 – 1 || Williams (4-2) || Springer (1-7) || Myers (10) || 25,662 || 20-23
|-  style="text-align:center; background:#fbb;"
| 44 || May 20 || @ Blue Jays || 9 – 1 || Hentgen (6-3) || Álvarez (4-5) || || 26,107 || 20-24
|-  style="text-align:center; background:#fbb;"
| 45 || May 21 || @ Blue Jays || 6 – 1 || Guzmán (2-6) || Arrojo (6-3) || || 30,108 || 20-25
|-  style="text-align:center; background:#bfb;"
| 46 || May 22 || @ Mariners || 5 – 2 || Johnson (2-1) || Moyer (2-5) || Hernández (8) || 29,522 || 21-25
|-  style="text-align:center; background:#bfb;"
| 47 || May 23 || @ Mariners || 6 – 3 || Yan (4-0) || Ayala (0-4) || Hernández (9) || 35,819 || 22-25
|-  style="text-align:center; background:#fbb;"
| 48 || May 24 || @ Mariners || 3 – 1 || Johnson (4-3) || Springer (1-8) || || 46,867 || 22-26
|-  style="text-align:center; background:#fbb;"
| 49 || May 25 || @ Athletics || 8 – 2 || Oquist (1-3) || Ruebel (0-1) || || 13,199 || 22-27
|-  style="text-align:center; background:#bfb;"
| 50 || May 26 || @ Athletics || 7 – 2 || Arrojo (7-3) || Candiotti (4-5) || || 9,801 || 23-27
|-  style="text-align:center; background:#fbb;"
| 51 || May 28 || Mariners || 5 – 2 || Moyer (3-5) || Johnson (2-2) || || 27,017 || 23-28
|-  style="text-align:center; background:#fbb;"
| 52 || May 29 || Mariners || 6 – 2 || Johnson (5-3) || Saunders (1-5) || || 32,142 || 23-29
|-  style="text-align:center; background:#bfb;"
| 53 || May 30 || Mariners || 5 – 2 || Springer (2-8) || Cloude (3-3) || Hernández (10) || 40,212 || 24-29
|-  style="text-align:center; background:#fbb;"
| 54 || May 31 || Mariners || 11 – 6 || Swift (4-3) || White (0-1) || || 35,184 || 24-30
|-

|-  style="text-align:center; background:#bfb;"
| 55 || June 1 || Rangers || 11 – 6 || Arrojo (8-3) || Burkett (4-3) || Hernández (11) || 24,388 || 25-30
|-  style="text-align:center; background:#fbb;"
| 56 || June 2 || Rangers || 11 – 6 || Witt (5-3) || Johnson (2-3) || || 24,477 || 25-31
|-  style="text-align:center; background:#fbb;"
| 57 || June 3 || @ Yankees || 7 – 1 || Hernández (1-0) || Saunders (1-6) || || 27,291 || 25-32
|-  style="text-align:center; background:#fbb;"
| 58 || June 4 || @ Yankees || 6 – 1 || Irabu (5-1) || Springer (2-9) || || 22,759 || 25-33
|-  style="text-align:center; background:#fbb;"
| 59 || June 5 || Expos || 5 – 2 || Hermanson (4-4) || White (0-2) || || 24,025 || 25-34
|-  style="text-align:center; background:#fbb;"
| 60 || June 6 || Expos || 7 – 5 || Telford (3-2) || Ruebel (0-2) || Urbina (14) || 26,501 || 25-35
|-  style="text-align:center; background:#bfb;"
| 61 || June 7 || Expos || 4 – 3 (11) || Lopez (2-1) || Kline (1-3) || || 26,334 || 26-35
|-  style="text-align:center; background:#fbb;"
| 62 || June 8 || @ Mets || 3 – 0 || Reed (7-3) || Springer (2-10) || || 24,186 || 26-36
|-  style="text-align:center; background:#bfb;"
| 63 || June 9 || @ Mets || 5 – 4 (11) || Mecir (2-0) || Hudek (0-3) || Hernández (12) || 30,336 || 27-36
|-  style="text-align:center; background:#fbb;"
| 64 || June 10 || @ Mets || 3 – 2 || Leiter (7-3) || White (0-3) || Rojas (2) || 21,682 || 27-37
|-  style="text-align:center; background:#fbb;"
| 65 || June 12 || @ Red Sox || 5 – 1 || Wakefield (7-3) || Arrojo (8-4) || || 31,994 || 27-38
|-  style="text-align:center; background:#fbb;"
| 66 || June 14 || @ Red Sox || 3 – 2 || Gordon (4-1) || Lopez (2-2) || || 27,768 || 27-39
|-  style="text-align:center; background:#bfb;"
| 67 || June 15 || Blue Jays || 8 – 7 || White (1-3) || Quantrill (0-3) || Hernández (13) || 24,122 || 28-39
|-  style="text-align:center; background:#bfb;"
| 68 || June 16 || Blue Jays || 4 – 3 || Mecir (3-0) || Myers (2-2) || || 24,278 || 29-39
|-  style="text-align:center; background:#bfb;"
| 69 || June 17 || Blue Jays || 2 – 1 || Arrojo (9-4) || Guzmán (3-9) || Hernández (14) || 24,394 || 30-39
|-  style="text-align:center; background:#fbb;"
| 70 || June 18 || Red Sox || 7 – 5 (10) || Wasdin (4-3) || Yan (4-1) || Gordon (21) || 30,177 || 30-40
|-  style="text-align:center; background:#fbb;"
| 71 || June 19 || Red Sox || 4 – 1 || Avery (4-1) || Saunders (1-7) || Gordon (22) || 32,375 || 30-41
|-  style="text-align:center; background:#bfb;"
| 72 || June 20 || Red Sox || 8 – 5 || Santana (2-0) || Saberhagen (8-5) || Hernández (15) || 41,169 || 31-41
|-  style="text-align:center; background:#fbb;"
| 73 || June 21 || Red Sox || 3 – 1 || Martínez (9-2) || Johnson (2-4) || Gordon (23) || 40,348 || 31-42
|-  style="text-align:center; background:#fbb;"
| 74 || June 22 || Marlins || 3 – 2 (12) || Alfonseca (1-2) || Mecir (3-1) || || 25,623 || 31-43
|-  style="text-align:center; background:#bfb;"
| 75 || June 23 || Marlins || 6 – 4 || Lopez (3-2) || Dempster (1-2) || Hernández (16) || 27,523 || 32-43
|-  style="text-align:center; background:#fbb;"
| 76 || June 24 || @ Marlins || 8 – 4 || Meadows (6-6) || Saunders (1-8) || || 19,501 || 32-44
|-  style="text-align:center; background:#fbb;"
| 77 || June 25 || @ Marlins || 5 – 1 || Hernández (6-4) || Santana (2-1) || || 16,826 || 32-45
|-  style="text-align:center; background:#fbb;"
| 78 || June 26 || @ Phillies || 7 – 0 || Green (6-4) || Johnson (2-5) || || 17,559 || 32-46
|-  style="text-align:center; background:#bfb;"
| 79 || June 27 || @ Phillies || 5 – 1 || Arrojo (10-4) || Schilling (7-8) || || 44,262 || 33-46
|-  style="text-align:center; background:#bfb;"
| 80 || June 28 || @ Phillies || 5 – 4 || Lopez (4-2) || Gomes (6-3) || Hernández (17) || 25,157 || 34-46
|-  style="text-align:center; background:#fbb;"
| 81 || June 30 || Braves || 7 – 2 || Neagle (9-6) || Saunders (1-9) || || 41,047 || 34-47
|-

|-  style="text-align:center; background:#fbb;"
| 82 || July 1 || Braves || 6 – 5 || Springer (5-3) || Hernández (0-3) || Ligtenberg (8) || 41,100 || 34-48
|-  style="text-align:center; background:#fbb;"
| 83 || July 2 || Braves || 6 – 0 || Maddux (12-2) || Arrojo (10-5) || || 40,749 || 34-49
|-  style="text-align:center; background:#fbb;"
| 84 || July 3 || @ Blue Jays || 3 – 2 (10) || Myers (3-2) || Yan (4-2) || || 25,625 || 34-50
|-  style="text-align:center; background:#fbb;"
| 85 || July 4 || @ Blue Jays || 8 – 0 || Carpenter (5-3) || Springer (2-11) || || 29,198 || 34-51
|-  style="text-align:center; background:#fbb;"
| 86 || July 5 || @ Blue Jays || 2 – 1 || Quantrill (1-3) || White (1-4) || Myers (23) || 31,240 || 34-52
|-  style="text-align:center; background:#fbb;"
| 87 || July 9 || Yankees || 2 – 0 || Pettitte (11-5) || Rekar (0-1) || Rivera (23) || 38,386 || 34-53
|-  style="text-align:center; background:#fbb;"
| 88 || July 10 || Yankees || 8 – 4 || Irabu (7-3) || Álvarez (4-6) || Mendoza (1) || 40,363 || 34-54
|-  style="text-align:center; background:#fbb;"
| 89 || July 11 || Yankees || 2 – 0 || Cone (13-2) || Arrojo (10-6) || Rivera (24) || 44,589 || 34-55
|-  style="text-align:center; background:#fbb;"
| 90 || July 12 || Yankees || 9 – 2 || Stanton (4-0) || Hernández (0-4) || || 43,373 || 34-56
|-  style="text-align:center; background:#fbb;"
| 91 || July 13 || Red Sox || 2 – 0 || Avery (6-2) || Santana (2-2) || Gordon (26) || || 34-57
|-  style="text-align:center; background:#bfb;"
| 92 || July 14 || Red Sox || 5 – 4 || Lopez (5-2) || Mahay (1-1) || || 27,310 || 35-57
|-  style="text-align:center; background:#fbb;"
| 93 || July 15 || @ Angels || 4 – 2 || Hasegawa (4-1) || Álvarez (4-7) || Percival (27) || 19,681 || 35-58
|-  style="text-align:center; background:#bfb;"
| 94 || July 16 || @ Angels || 8 – 1 || Arrojo (11-6) || Sparks (3-2) || || 24,085 || 36-58
|-  style="text-align:center; background:#fbb;"
| 95 || July 17 || @ Rangers || 7 – 4 || Oliver (5-7) || Mecir (3-2) || Wetteland (26) || 33,876 || 36-59
|-  style="text-align:center; background:#fbb;"
| 96 || July 18 || @ Rangers || 9 – 8 || Crabtree (4-0) || Yan (4-3) || || 44,356 || 36-60
|-  style="text-align:center; background:#fbb;"
| 97 || July 19 || @ Rangers || 7 – 4 || Burkett (6-10) || Rekar (0-2) || Wetteland (27) || 34,700 || 36-61
|-  style="text-align:center; background:#fbb;"
| 98 || July 21 || Mariners || 8 – 3 || Moyer (7-7) || Álvarez (4-8) || || 30,298 || 36-62
|-  style="text-align:center; background:#bfb;"
| 99 || July 22 || Mariners || 7 – 5 || Lopez (6-2) || Johnson (9-9) || Hernández (18) || 31,558 || 37-62
|-  style="text-align:center; background:#bfb;"
| 100 || July 24 || Athletics || 6 – 0 || Saunders (2-9) || Oquist (6-7) || || 25,476 || 38-62
|-  style="text-align:center; background:#bfb;"
| 101 || July 25 || Athletics || 7 – 5 || Hernández (1-4) || Rogers (10-4) || || 30,179 || 39-62
|-  style="text-align:center; background:#bfb;"
| 102 || July 26 || Athletics || 3 – 1 || Álvarez (5-8) || Candiotti (5-13) || Yan (1) || 37,194 || 40-62
|-  style="text-align:center; background:#bfb;"
| 103 || July 27 || Athletics || 11 – 5 || Rekar (1-2) || Stein (4-6) || || 24,359 || 41-62
|-  style="text-align:center; background:#fbb;"
| 104 || July 28 || @ White Sox || 4 – 1 || Baldwin (6-4) || Arrojo (11-7) || Simas (10) || 18,402 || 41-63
|-  style="text-align:center; background:#bfb;"
| 105 || July 29 || @ White Sox || 7 – 2 || Saunders (3-9) || Parque (2-4) || || 17,387 || 42-63
|-  style="text-align:center; background:#bfb;"
| 106 || July 31 || Tigers || 5 – 1 || Santana (3-2) || Greisinger (1-6) || Hernández (19) || 25,654 || 43-63
|-

|-  style="text-align:center; background:#fbb;"
| 107 || August 1 || Tigers || 8 – 0 || Moehler (12-7) || Álvarez (5-9) || || 28,130 || 43-64
|-  style="text-align:center; background:#fbb;"
| 108 || August 2 || Tigers || 3 – 2 || Powell (2-2) || Rekar (1-3) || Jones (19) || 26,120 || 43-65
|-  style="text-align:center; background:#fbb;"
| 109 || August 3 || White Sox || 6 – 1 || Baldwin (7-4) || Arrojo (11-8) || || 24,698 || 43-66
|-  style="text-align:center; background:#fbb;"
| 110 || August 4 || White Sox || 8 – 6 || Castillo (5-4) || Saunders (3-10) || Simas (11) || 24,866 || 43-67
|-  style="text-align:center; background:#bfb;"
| 111 || August 5 || White Sox || 7 – 3 || Hernández (2-4) || Howry (0-2) || || 24,814 || 44-67
|-  style="text-align:center; background:#fbb;"
| 112 || August 7 || Indians || 5 – 1 || Gooden (4-6) || Álvarez (5-10) || || 32,254 || 44-68
|-  style="text-align:center; background:#fbb;"
| 113 || August 8 || Indians || 6 – 2 || Nagy (10-7) || Rekar (1-4) || || 37,108 || 44-69
|-  style="text-align:center; background:#bfb;"
| 114 || August 9 || Indians || 2 – 1 || Mecir (4-2) || Assenmacher (2-5) || || 36,641 || 45-69
|-  style="text-align:center; background:#fbb;"
| 115 || August 10 || Orioles || 2 – 1 || Guzmán (8-12) || Saunders (3-11) || Benítez (16) || 26,352 || 45-70
|-  style="text-align:center; background:#bfb;"
| 116 || August 11 || Orioles || 2 – 1 || Mecir (5-2) || Benítez (4-3) || || 26,472 || 46-70
|-  style="text-align:center; background:#fbb;"
| 117 || August 12 || Orioles || 7 – 0 || Erickson (12-9) || Álvarez (5-11) || || 29,211 || 46-71
|-  style="text-align:center; background:#fbb;"
| 118 || August 13 || @ Royals || 6 – 4 || Montgomery (2-4) || Hernández (2-5) || || 18,289 || 46-72
|-  style="text-align:center; background:#fbb;"
| 119 || August 14 || @ Royals || 11 – 9 || Haney (5-5) || Arrojo (11-9) || Service (3) || 28,133 || 46-73
|-  style="text-align:center; background:#bfb;"
| 120 || August 15 || @ Royals || 8 – 6 || Mecir (6-2) || Bones (0-1) || Hernández (20) || 18,706 || 47-73
|-  style="text-align:center; background:#bfb;"
| 121 || August 16 || @ Royals || 8 – 3 || Santana (4-2) || Belcher (11-10) || || 16,762 || 48-73
|-  style="text-align:center; background:#fbb;"
| 122 || August 17 || @ Indians || 4 – 3 || Colón (13-6) || Álvarez (5-12) || Jackson (30) || 43,139 || 48-74
|-  style="text-align:center; background:#fbb;"
| 123 || August 18 || @ Indians || 4 – 2 || Gooden (5-6) || Rekar (1-5) || Jackson (31) || 42,967 || 48-75
|-  style="text-align:center; background:#fbb;"
| 124 || August 19 || Orioles || 6 – 4 || Mussina (12-6) || Arrojo (11-10) || Benítez (19) || 44,530 || 48-76
|-  style="text-align:center; background:#bfb;"
| 125 || August 20 || Orioles || 4 – 2 || Saunders (4-11) || Rhodes (3-4) || Hernández (21) || 44,566 || 49-76
|-  style="text-align:center; background:#fbb;"
| 126 || August 21 || Royals || 6 – 5 || Whisenant (2-1) || Yan (4-4) || Montgomery (27) || 25,638 || 49-77
|-  style="text-align:center; background:#fbb;"
| 127 || August 22 || Royals || 3 – 2 || Rosado (7-9) || Álvarez (5-13) || Montgomery (28) || 27,346 || 49-78
|-  style="text-align:center; background:#fbb;"
| 128 || August 23 || Royals || 11 – 5 || Rapp (10-11) || Rekar (1-6) || || 33,123 || 49-79
|-  style="text-align:center; background:#fbb;"
| 129 || August 25 || Twins || 4 – 1 || Rodriguez (4-2) || Arrojo (11-11) || Aguilera (32) || 23,126 || 49-80
|-  style="text-align:center; background:#fbb;"
| 130 || August 26 || Twins || 7 – 3 || Tewksbury (6-9) || Saunders (4-12) || Aguilera (33) || 23,059 || 49-81
|-  style="text-align:center; background:#bfb;"
| 131 || August 27 || Twins || 10 – 3 || Santana (5-2) || Milton (7-11) || || 23,314 || 50-81
|-  style="text-align:center; background:#bfb;"
| 132 || August 28 || @ Tigers || 4 – 3 || Mecir (7-2) || Moehler (12-11) || Hernández (22) || 19,534 || 51-81
|-  style="text-align:center; background:#bfb;"
| 133 || August 29 || @ Tigers || 10 – 6 || Springer (3-11) || Thompson (10-12) || || ? || 52-81
|-  style="text-align:center; background:#fbb;"
| 134 || August 29 || @ Tigers || 8 – 2 || Greisinger (4-7) || Rekar (1-7) || || 16,406 || 52-82
|-  style="text-align:center; background:#bfb;"
| 135 || August 30 || @ Tigers || 10 – 5 || Arrojo (12-11) || Powell (3-5) || Hernández (23) || 14,765 || 53-82
|-  style="text-align:center; background:#fbb;"
| 136 || August 31 || @ Twins || 2 – 1 || Tewksbury (7-9) || Saunders (4-13) || Aguilera (34) || 7,888 || 53-83
|-

|- style="text-align:center;" bgcolor=#fbb
| 137 || September 1 || @ Twins || 6 – 5 || Serafini (7–4) || Hernandez (2–6) ||  || 7.947 || 53-84
|- style="text-align:center;" bgcolor=#bfb
| 138 || September 2 || @ Twins || 4 – 1 || Yan (5–4) || Hawkins (7–13) || Lopez (1) || 7,165 || 54-84
|- style="text-align:center;" bgcolor=#fbb
| 139 || September 3 || @ Twins || 5 – 4 (12)|| Guardado (3–1) || White (1–5) || || 7,072 || 54-85
|- style="text-align:center;" bgcolor=#bfb
| 140 || September 4 || @ Athletics || 5 – 2 || Arrojo (13–11) || Haynes (10–7) || Hernandez (24) || 8.198 || 55-85
|- style="text-align:center;" bgcolor=#fbb
| 141 || September 5 || @ Athletics ||3 – 0
|Rogers (13–7)||Saunders (4–14)
|  ||34,193
|55-86
|- style="text-align:center;" bgcolor=#fbb
| 142 || September 6 || @ Athletics || 9 – 2||Candiotti (11–15)
|Santana (5–3)
|  ||35,162
|55-87
|- style="text-align:center;" bgcolor=#bfb
| 143 || September 8 || @ Mariners || 10 – 0||Alvarez (6–13)
|Suzuki (0–1)
|  || 20,679||56-87
|- style="text-align:center;" bgcolor=#fbb
| 144 || September 9 || @ Mariners || 5 – 2||Abbot (0–1)
|Arrojo (13–12)
|Timlin (14)
|22,256
|56-88
|- style="text-align:center;" bgcolor=#bfb
| 145 || September 11 || Rangers || 3 – 2||Saunders (5–14)
|Stottlemyre (12–13)
|Hernandez (25)
|28,522
|57-88
|- style="text-align:center;" bgcolor=#fbb
| 146 || September 12 || Rangers ||8 – 2
|Helling (19–7)
|Santana (5–4)
|  ||31,278
|57-89
|- style="text-align:center;" bgcolor=#bfb
| 147 || September 13 || Rangers || 10 – 5||White (2–5)
|Loaiza (9–9)
|  ||34,007
|58-89
|- style="text-align:center;" bgcolor=#fbb
| 148 || September 14 || Angels || 4 – 2||Hasegawa (8–3)
|Lopez (6–3)
|Percival (40)
|24,279
|58-90
|- style="text-align:center;" bgcolor=#bfb
| 149 || September 15 || Angels || 8 – 1||Arrojo (14–12)
|Juden (8-14)
|  ||24,347
|59-90
|- style="text-align:center;" bgcolor=#bfb
| 150 || September 16 || Yankees || 7 – 0||Saunders (6–14)
|Pettitte (16-10)
|  ||38,862
|60-90
|- style="text-align:center;" bgcolor=#fbb
| 151 || September 17 || Yankees ||4 – 0
|Irabu (12–9)
|Santana (5–5)||  ||38,820
|60-91
|- style="text-align:center;" bgcolor=#bfb
| 152 || September 18 || Blue Jays || 6 – 1||Rekar (2–7)
|Escobar (6–3)
|  ||32,053
|61-91
|- style="text-align:center;" bgcolor=#bfb
| 153 || September 19 || Blue Jays ||7 – 5
|Lopez (7–3)
|Van Ryn (0–2)
|Hernandez (26)
|35,689
|62-91
|- style="text-align:center;" bgcolor=#fbb
| 154 || September 20 || Blue Jays ||7 – 5
|Risley (2–4)
|Lopez (7–4)
|  ||32,183
|62-92
|- style="text-align:center;" bgcolor=#fbb
| 155 || September 21 || @ Red Sox ||4 – 3
|Saberhagen (15–7)
|Saunders (6–15)
|Gordon (43)
|?
|62-93
|- style="text-align:center;" bgcolor=#bfb
| 156 || September 21 || @ Red Sox ||8 – 4
|Wade (1–0)
|Reyes (3–3)
|  ||23,379
|63-93
|- style="text-align:center;" bgcolor=#fbb
| 157 || September 22 || @ Red Sox || 11 – 2||Schourek (8–9)
|Santana (5–6) 
|  ||20,399
|63-94
|- style="text-align:center;" bgcolor=#fbb
| 158 || September 23 || @ Red Sox || 5 – 4||Avery (10–7)
|Rekar (2–8)
|Gordon (44)
|23,240
|63-95
|- style="text-align:center;" bgcolor=#fbb
| 159 || September 24 ||  @ Yankees ||5 – 2
|Buddie (4–1)
|Alvarez (6–14)
|Nelson (3)
|24,555
|63-96
|- style="text-align:center;" bgcolor=#fbb
| 160 || September 25 ||  @ Yankees ||6 – 1
|Hernandez (12–4)||Eiland (0–1)
|  ||32,447
|63-97
|- style="text-align:center;" bgcolor=#fbb
| 161 || September 26 ||  @ Yankees || 3 – 1||Cone (20–7)
|Wade (1–1) ||  ||41,150
|63-98
|- style="text-align:center;" bgcolor=#fbb
| 162 || September 27 ||  @ Yankees ||8 – 3
|Bruske (4–0)
|White (2–6)
|  ||49,608
|63-99
|-

Awards and honors
1998 MLB All-Star Game selection:
 Rolando Arrojo, pitcher

Team leaders
 Home runs – Fred McGriff (19)
 Runs batted in – Fred McGriff (81)
 Batting average – Aaron Ledesma (.324)
 Hits – Quinton McCracken (179)
 Stolen bases – Randy Winn (26)
 Walks – Fred McGriff (79)
 Wins – Rolando Arrojo (14)
 Strikeouts – Tony Saunders (172)
 Earned run average – Rolando Arrojo (starters) (3.56), Albie Lopez (relievers) (2.60)
 Saves – Roberto Hernández (26)

Farm system

References

1998 Tampa Bay Devil Rays at Baseball Reference
1998 Tampa Bay Devil Rays at Baseball Almanac''

Tampa Bay Devil Rays seasons
Inaugural Major League Baseball seasons by team
Tampa Bay Devil Rays
Tampa Bay Devil Rays